Robert "Bob" McCallum Blumenthal (7 February 1931, Chicago – 8 November 2012) was an American mathematician, specializing in probability theory. He is known for Blumenthal's zero-one law.

Biography
He received his Ph.D. in mathematics from Cornell University in 1956 under Gilbert Hunt with thesis An Extended Markov Property.

Blumenthal became in 1956 an instructor at the University of Washington, was eventually promoted to full professor, and in 1997 retired there. He was on sabbatical for the academic year 1961–1962 at the Institute for Advanced Study in Princeton and for the academic year 1966–1967 in Germany.

Upon his death he was survived by his wife and two sons.

Selected publications

Articles

with R. K. Getoor: 
with R. K. Getoor: 
with R. K. Getoor and D. B. Ray: 
with R. K. Getoor: 
with R. K. Getoor:

Books
with R. K. Getoor:

References

1931 births
2012 deaths
20th-century American mathematicians
21st-century American mathematicians
Probability theorists
Cornell University alumni
University of Washington faculty